Tylopelta is a genus of treehoppers in the family Membracidae. There are at least four described species in Tylopelta.

Species
These four species belong to the genus Tylopelta:
 Tylopelta appendiculata Fonseca g
 Tylopelta gibbera (Stal, 1869) c g b
 Tylopelta monstrosa Fairmaire c g
 Tylopelta obscura Strümpel 1974 c g
Data sources: i = ITIS, c = Catalogue of Life, g = GBIF, b = Bugguide.net

References

Further reading

External links

 

Membracinae
Auchenorrhyncha genera